Mackay–Eungella Road is a continuous  road route in the Mackay region of Queensland, Australia. The entire route is signed as State Route 64. It is a state-controlled regional road (number 532).

 At the western end it becomes Eungella Dam Road.

Route description
The road commences at an intersection with the Peak Downs Highway (State Route 70) in Alexandra. The land beside the road is primarily used to grow sugar cane.

It is deemed unsuitable for caravans, although it is frequently used by large trucks. The road (and State Route 64) ends at an intersection with Bee Creek Road in Eungella, but the physical road continues a further  km to the  Eungella Dam picnic area.

Eungella Dam Road
This road, part of which was constructed in 1969 in conjunction with the dam, provides access to many of the tourist attractions that are of interest to visitors. These include Eungella National Park and Eungella Dam.

Road condition
The road is fully sealed.

History

 was established as a pastoral area in 1862, and most of the available land was quickly taken up as pastoral runs, including one named Eungella on what is now known as the Eungella Plateau. Some early settlers in the Pioneer Valley experimented with sugar cane and other cash crops, with sugar cane being so successful that it soon became the predominant crop in the district.

To cater for a growing industry the first commercial sugar mill was built at Alexandra in 1868. The Pleystowe mill followed in 1869, and the Marian mill in 1883. As the industry expanded new mills were built along the river valley and Cattle Creek, culminating in the Cattle Creek mill at Finch Hatton in 1906.

Sugar cane became so important to the Queensland economy that a railway was built to transport cane to the mills. It arrived at Mirani, then known as Hamilton, in 1895. The route was via Alexandra,  and Newbury Junction (near Marian) bypassing Pleystowe. Later it became the main line to Mackay, with a station at Pleystowe, and the Nebo line became a branch line. The main line was extended to Pinnacle by 1902, Finch Hatton by 1904, and Netherdale by 1911.

The first roads in the valley were tracks connecting the pastoral runs to Mackay. The growth of the sugar cane industry drove the need for more substantial roads to transport the crops to the mills, and to provide access to the port in Mackay for other commerce. Later, roads were needed to transport cane from an expanded source to railway stations.

Gold was discovered in several locations on the Eungella Plateau in 1888. The largest field was at Crediton, on the southern end of the plateau, where a town for about 200 miners and their families was established. Access to the goldfields was by tracks some distance south of the present road. Logging also took place on the plateau from 1904 until 1941, when the Eungella National Park was declared. By then about 50% of the original forest had been cleared.

By the 1930s a very basic road up the mountain on the present alignment had been constructed, and road building was occurring on the plateau. In 1935 a new settler on his first trip up the mountain described the road as a "perilous climb".

Major intersections
All distances are from Google Maps.
The entire road is in the Mackay local government area.

See also

 List of road routes in Queensland
 List of numbered roads in Queensland
 Lt Thomas Armstrong Memorial, in Mirani
 Mirani railway station
 Mount Martin Cane Lift, near Mirani
 Kinchant Dam, near Mirani
 Teemburra Dam, near Pinnacle
 Finch Hatton War Memorial
 Finch Hatton railway station

Notes

References

Roads in Queensland